The Daihatsu Zebra is a series of cab over vans and pickup trucks produced and sold by Japanese automaker Daihatsu's Indonesian subsidiary from 1986 to 2007.

First generation (S88/S89; 1986) 

The first-generation Daihatsu Zebra was launched on 1 August 1986 as an enlarged seventh-generation Daihatsu Hijet. It was equipped with a  1.0-liter 3-cylinder CB engine from previous generation. In October 1989, this received a 1.3-liter 16-valve HC-C engine rather than the earlier one-liter unit, and sales doubled year-on-year. The 1298 cc unit produces  and was coupled to a four-speed manual transmission. The pickup truck version started using the "D130 Jumbo" badge, available until January 1996.

There was a unique front-mid engine SUV-style based from Daihatsu Zebra 1.3 sold only in Indonesia between 1990–1994, known as "Shelby Patriot". This car shared almost everything from Zebra, except the body now has a 3-door SUV style similar to the Feroza and made from fiberglass.

Second generation (S90/S91/S92; 1995) 

The second-generation Daihatsu Zebra van, known as the Zebra Espass was based on the eighth-generation Hijet and introduced in April 1995. The pickup truck version retained the D130 Jumbo badge, available from January 1996. It was also produced and sold in Malaysia as the Perodua Rusa from 1996. It has a completely rounded, aerodynamic styling. When it was first introduced, it was powered by the same engine as the seventh generation Hijet-based Zebra, the 1.3-liter 16-valve HC-C engine with carburetor. In December 1996, the Espass Supervan was launched with the 1.6-liter 16-valve HD-C engine (later used on the Terios-based Taruna), standard air conditioners, audio system with tape and racing wheels.

In 2000, the Zebra Espass badge for the van version and the D130 Jumbo badge for the pickup truck version were replaced by the new Zebra badge and the van version was offered in five trim levels: Blind Van, ZT (with swing-out center side doors, swing-out rear door and face-to-face rear seats instead of sliding doors, lift-up tailgate and front-facing rear seat), ZL, ZX and ZSX. It is referred to as the Neo Zebra. The Blind Van, ZT and ZL retained the previous 1.3-liter engine with carburetor from the previous model. While the ZX and ZSX which replaced the Espass Supervan retained the 1.6-liter engine with carburetor, from 2001, the 1.6-liter 16-valve HD-E engine with electronic fuel injection (EFI) was also available as an option. Both the 1.6-liter engines with carburetor and EFI were later replaced in January 2002 by the 1.5-liter 16-valve HE-E engine with EFI (also used on the Taruna) due to changes in excise tax structure. Since then, the ZT van was discontinued. In 2003, the van received the same red and white taillights with ornaments and rear license plate holder as used on the Perodua Rusa, and added two new van variants: ZL9 and ZL Xtra. The ZL9 van variant featured swing-out rear door and face-to-face rear seats instead of lift-up tailgate and front-facing rear seat while retained the sliding doors.

The Zebra was refreshed in late 2004 and is referred to as the Zebra Master, and features an ornament on top of the grille with the larger and bolder chrome Daihatsu symbol emblem used on the recent Daihatsu vehicles, and added two new face-to-face van variants: ZL Xtra9 and ZX9 (replaced the regular ZX EFI trim). The ZSX van received a chrome ornament and the chrome Daihatsu symbol emblem on the steering wheel. The ZX and ZSX vans with the 1.5-liter engine with EFI was replaced by the ZX9 and ZSX vans with the 1.5-liter 16-valve HE-C engine with carburetor. The pickup trucks with the same 1.5-liter engine with carburetor as the ZX9 and ZSX vans were made available. In 2007, the pickup trucks, Blind Van, ZL, ZL9, ZL Xtra and ZL Xtra9 van variants with the 1.3-liter 16-valve HC-E engine with EFI were made available as an option, and the ZSX van with the 1.5-liter engine with EFI was made available again as an option. The pickup trucks with the same 1.5-liter engine with EFI as the ZSX van were made available as an option as well. Production of the Zebra ended in October 2007 when it was replaced by the Gran Max.

References 

Zebra
Microvans
Pickup trucks
Vehicles introduced in 1985